Floyer is both a surname and a given name. Notable people with the name include:

Surname:
 John Floyer (physician) (1649–1734), English physician and author
 John Floyer (Tamworth MP) (c1681–1762), English politician, MP for Tamworth 1741–42
 John Floyer (Dorset MP) (1811–1887), English Conservative politician, MP for Dorset 1846–67 and 1864–95

Given name:
 Floyer Sydenham (1710–1787), English classical scholar